is a 2010 Japanese computer animated film written and directed by Jun Awazu.

Plot
In 2047, an unknown, alien life-form, codenamed FOS, attacks Earth, destroying the world's major cities in one fell swoop. The survivors unite to fight back, and three years later they erect a world shield, the Diffuser, to stop further invasions. Now in 2053, a last, desperate counterattack is being mounted against the FOS. Taishi Akejima, a soldier in the Planetary Defense Forces Alliance, would like nothing better than a shot at the aliens responsible for his father's death six years ago. However, the new offensive requires a powerful weapon to be deployed and the Diffuser to be disabled, leaving the entire planet terribly vulnerable once more. Will humanity regain the stars or lose everything in the final, ultimate gamble?

Cast
In the different language versions, some of the character's names were changed.

Taishi Akejima
Character name: Taishi Akejima (Japanese), Hiroshi Akishima (English), Hiroshi (French)
, Tony Marot (French)

Koyomi Akejima
Character name: Koyomi Akejima (Japanese), Koyomi Akishima (English), Koyomi (French)
, Jennifer Fauveau (French)

Kōshirō Akejima
Character name: Kōshirō Akejima (Japanese), Koshiro Akishima (English), Kôshiro (French)
, Marc Brétonnière (French)

Ken Tazaki
, Jochen Haegele (French)

Kaori Sagawa
, Magali Rosenzweig (French)

Yūra Yoshizawa
, Virginie Ledieu (French)

Commissioner Yoshizawa
Character name: Commissioner Yoshizawa (Japanese), Area Commander Yoshizawa (English), Seiji (French)
, Frédéric Souterelle (French)

Nakamura
Voiced by: Greg Ayres (English), Grégory Laisné (French)

Narrator
, Bruno Meyere (French)

Music
The ending theme is "Ryūgū no Tsukai" (竜宮の使い) by Chitose Hajime.

Home media
The film was released on Blu-Ray in 2012.

References

External links
 

Sentai Filmwork's Official Planzet Website

2010 anime films
Fiction set in 2053
2010s science fiction films
Japanese computer-animated films
Japanese science fiction films
Mecha anime and manga
Sentai Filmworks
CoMix Wave Films films
Films set in the 2050s